32P/Comas Solà is a periodic comet with a current orbital period of 8.8 years.

The comet nucleus is estimated to be 8.4 kilometers in diameter.

History
32P/Comas Solà was discovered November 5, 1926, by Josep Comas Solà. As part of his work on asteroids for the Fabra Observatory (Barcelona), he was taking photographs with a  telescope. The comet's past orbital evolution became a point of interest as several astronomers suggested early on that the comet might be a return of the then lost periodic comet Spitaler (aka 113P/Spitaler). In 1935 additional positions had been obtained, and P. Ramensky investigated the orbital motion back to 1911. He noted the comet passed very close to Jupiter during May 1912 and that, prior to this approach, the comet had a perihelion distance of 2.15 AU and an orbital period of 9.43 years. The identity with comet Spitaler was thus disproven.

In 1933, the Danish astronomer Julie Vinter Hansen undertook significant new research which calculated the orbit of the comet up to 1980, predicting when it would return to the earth's orbit.

Trivia
The title of the early Tangerine Dream piece "Fly and Collision of Coma[s] Sola", appearing on the Alpha Centauri (1971) album, refers to this comet, which at the time was undergoing a moderately close (0.73 AU) approach to Jupiter.

References

External links 
 Orbital simulation from JPL (Java) / Horizons Ephemeris
 Elements and Ephemeris for 32P/Comas Sola – Minor Planet Center
 32P/Comas Sola – Seiichi Yoshida @ aerith.net
 32P/Comas Solà – Gary W. Kronk's Cometography

Periodic comets
0032
Comets in 2014
19261105